The RCD Cup 1974 was the fifth edition of the RCD Cup tournament, held in Karachi, Pakistan in 1974. This was a three nation tournament played in league format between Malavan F.C. (from Iran), Pakistan and Turkey. 

This was the last tournament under the name of RCD Cup. This tournament was also the first time that Pakistan did not have any Bangali players due to Independence of East Pakistan in 1971 which became known as Bangladesh.

Iran did not send her national team for this tournament and it was Malavan F.C. that represented Iran at the tournament.

Venue

Results

Top scorers

2 Goals
 Melih Atacan

Squads

Malavan (Iran)

Pakistan

Turkey

Head coach:  Coskun Özari

References

RSSSF Page on RCD Cup tournament
Turkish Football Federation (for match details & squad list)
NationalFootballTeams
TURKFUTBULO

1974
1974
1974 in Pakistani sport
1974 in Asian football
1973–74 in Turkish football